The Blonde Bombshell is a British two-part mini-series based on the life and death of actress Diana Dors. It was produced by LWT for ITV, and first shown on 26 and 27 April 1999. Keeley Hawes played Dors during her early career (1945–1960) and Amanda Redman during her later years (1965–1984).

Dors' son, Mark, claims that the series got the story wrong, and offers a different portrayal of his mother.

Reception
Eddie Gibb of the Sunday Herald wrote "This is a sad story badly told."

References

External links

1999 British television series debuts
1999 British television series endings
1990s British drama television series
British biographical films
British television films
1990s British television miniseries
Works about actors
ITV television dramas
Television series by ITV Studios
London Weekend Television shows
English-language television shows
Films directed by Robert Bierman